The rank of fleet admiral is common in many science fiction sources as a senior military officer who commands a fleet of spaceships and the rank has been mentioned in numerous films, television productions, and science fiction literature sources.

The following are some of the more common occurrences of the fleet admiral rank within the realm of science fiction.

Star Trek

In the fictional universe of Star Trek, fleet admiral is the highest commissioned rank of the Starfleet. The first mention of the rank fleet admiral, was by Dr. McCoy on Star Trek: The Original Series, in the episode Space Seed.

It was not until Star Trek III: The Search for Spock that an actual fleet admiral was seen on camera, being the character of Fleet Admiral Morrow played by actor Robert Hooks.  Three other fleet admirals would be seen in subsequent motion pictures.

Star Wars
In the Imperial Navy of Star Wars, fleet admiral is considered a senior Imperial military rank for those who command sector fleets or task forces. Due to the size of the Imperial Navy, however, the necessity exists for even higher ranks. Imperial grand admirals are specially appointed and outrank all personnel, military and civil, save Emperor Palpatine and his appointed executors.

One Piece

In the fictional world of One Piece, the Fleet Admiral is the highest rank in the Marines, and the commander of the entire organization. As such, there is only one Fleet Admiral in the world at a time. His only superiors are the World Government Commander-in-Chief, the Gorosei and the World Nobles.

Some of his capabilities includes to start a Buster Call (the most destructive attack of the Marines in which an entire island is bombarded until wipe out all human life in it, and that can only be initiated by an Admiral or a rank above) and to summon the Admirals or any other Marine officer to a mission.

Being the senior of the three Admirals, who are known as the World Government's "Greatest Military Powers", the Fleet Admiral is also presumed to be the most powerful Marine in the world in terms of fighting skills.

The current Fleet Admiral is Sakazuki -formerly known as Admiral Akainu-, who won the position after defeating fellow Admiral Aokiji in a ten-day duel so ferocious that devastated the whole island of Punk Hazard and even changed its weather permanently.

Ender's Game

In the novel Ender's Game, a child soldier named Ender Wiggin is conscripted into a battle school for gifted youths.  During what Ender believes to be a final exam scenario, he is actually placed in command of a star fleet that proceeds to destroy a menacing alien race, all the while with Ender believing that his command of this fleet is only a simulation.  After learning the truth, Ender is told that he has been promoted to fleet admiral, and thus holds the rank at an age of no more than twelve years old.

Halo

In the video game series Halo, Fleet Admiral is the highest rank of the United Nations Space Command Navy. During the duration of the games the rank is held by Lord Terrence Hood 
Fictional military ranks